Jose Manuel Barrios (born June 26, 1957 in New York, New York), is a former Major League Baseball first baseman who played for the San Francisco Giants in .

External links

1957 births
Major League Baseball first basemen
Baseball players from New York (state)
San Francisco Giants players
Living people
Cedar Rapids Giants players
Charlotte O's players
Fresno Giants players
Great Falls Giants players
Phoenix Giants players
Rochester Red Wings players
Shreveport Captains players
Waterbury Giants players
South Miami Senior High School alumni